Snail slime (mucopolysaccharide) is a kind of mucus (an external bodily secretion) produced by snails, which are gastropod mollusks. Land snails and slugs both produce mucus, as does every other kind of gastropod, from marine, freshwater, and terrestrial habitats. The reproductive system of gastropods also produces mucus internally from special glands.

Externally, one kind of mucus is produced by the foot of the gastropod and is usually used for crawling. The other kind of external mucus has evolved to coat the external parts of the gastropod's body; in land species, this coating helps prevent desiccation of the exposed soft tissues. The foot mucus of a gastropod has some of the qualities of glue and some of the qualities of a lubricant, allowing land snails to crawl up vertical surfaces without falling off.

The slime trail that a land gastropod leaves behind is often visible as a silvery track on surfaces such as stone or concrete.

Description
Mucus is a gel consisting of a polymer network that functions as a protective layer for the integument and mucosal surfaces of both elementary animals and mammals.

The mucus of gastropods is not only used as a coating to cover the surfaces on which the snail crawls and a coating to cover the exposed soft parts of the body but also sometimes to allow a resting snail to adhere passively to surfaces, such as rock, making a temporary sealing structure called the epiphragm. Mucus is produced by a large gland located below the snail's mouth.

The foot of gastropods is covered with a thin layer of this mucus, which is used for a variety of functions, including locomotion, adherence, lubrication, repulsing predators, recognizing other snails, following a trail to a known destination and during reproduction. The discharge looks like a gel and it contains approximately 91 to 98% water by weight, depending on the species, combined with a small amount of high molecular weight glycoproteins (Denny, 1984). In Cornu aspersum, these glycoproteins reach weights of 82, 97 and 175 kDa.

Locomotion 
Locomotion in snails comes from a series of muscle contractions called pedal waves and relaxations called inter waves. The waves created help propel the snail forward whilst pushing the thin layer of mucus used as lubrication, behind them. In an Experimental Biology article, research has been presented showing that each wave is indeed creating a propulsive force using the mucus to reduce resistance.

Land mollusks travel by adhesive locomotion via muscular waves that propagate from tail to head. The snail mucus has an adapted flow behavior that allows transmittance of the muscular force while maintaining adhesion. When inactive, many mollusks of both marine and terrestrial species, use the secretion to stick to various surfaces. However, although it is so diluted that it can commonly act as a lubricant, it can also have strong adhesive properties. In their unique mating ritual, Limax maximus use a mucus thread to suspend themselves from elevated locations like tree branches. In Cornu aspersum, there are two types of secretion. One type is translucent and not adhesive, the kind that the snail leaves behind as it moves (the slime trail), and the other is similar but thicker, condensed, more viscous and elastic, which is used to adhere to various surfaces. Both are clearly differentiated by the type of proteins present in them.

Slime Production 
A snail releases different kinds of mucus depending on the way it is stimulated. When the stimulation is normal, the slime is viscous (sticky) but if the snail is disturbed continuously or even violently, it releases clear foamy secretions. If the snail is sexually aroused the slime it releases is clear and viscous (sticky). In the case of Cornu aspersum, the discharge is composed of synthesized products from various types of secretory glands. These are all single-cell glands found in connective tissue and they secrete their products via pores that pass between the epidermal cells. They are of various shapes and usually have a long excretory duct. There are eight different types of secreting glands. Four of these different types secrete protein, calcium, pigments and lipids.

Medical Uses 
Some of the characteristics of snail slime have shown to be useful in Chinese medicine. Traditional Chinese medicine has used slime in a variety of ways to treat a variety of illness and cosmetic issues. "For examples, snail powders can treat urinary obstruction by putting them above navel, can prevent nosebleed by blowing the powers into nostrils, can cure deaf by dropping snail powers/wine solution into the ears, can soothe toothache and laryngeal diseases. Furthermore the snail solution obtained by putting snails in water or wine can be used for curing hemorrhoids, boils, scrofulous, scars, and acne. It has also been used as skin creams for wrinkles and dry skin in cosmetics." The Chinese also have used the color-fast dry qualities of snail slime as a natural dye that represented wealth and power. The mucus has shown to be proficient in several biological activities including antimicrobial, antioxidant, anti-tyrosinase, and anti-tumoral activities.

A new generation of tissue adhesive has been developed by using natural adhesion phenomena and mechanisms, such as snail mucus gel, which exhibits excellent haemostatic activity, biocompatibility, and biodegradibility. It is effective in accelerating the healing of full-thickness skin wounds in both normal and diabetic male rats.

See also
 Heliciculture
 Mucus
Mucous pedal gland

References
<ref>Yu, Dan-Ni; Tian, Dan; He, Ji-Huan (2018-06-01). "Snail-based nanofibers". Materials Letters. 220: 5–7. https://www.sciencedirect.com/science/article/abs/pii/S0167577X18302908?via%3Dihub

<ref>Noothuan, N., Apitanyasai, K., Panha, S. et al. Snail mucus from the mantle and foot of two land snails, Lissachatina fulica and Hemiplecta distincta, exhibits different protein profile and biological activity. BMC Res Notes 14, 138 (2021). https://doi.org/10.1186/s13104-021-05557-0
Gastropod anatomy
Mollusc products